The 1959 Cincinnati Reds season consisted of the Reds finishing in a fifth-place tie with the Chicago Cubs in the National League standings, with a record of 74–80, 13 games behind the NL and World Champion Los Angeles Dodgers.

Prior to the season the club, after calling themselves the Cincinnati Redlegs for the past six seasons, changed its nickname back to the Reds. The Reds played their home games at Crosley Field, where they attracted 801,298 fans, eighth and last in the Senior Circuit.

Offseason 
 January 30, 1959: Smoky Burgess, Harvey Haddix and Don Hoak were traded by the Reds to the Pittsburgh Pirates for Whammy Douglas, Jim Pendleton, Frank Thomas, and John Powers.
 March 20, 1959: Eddie Miksis was released by the Reds.

Regular season 
For the second consecutive season, the Reds played under two managers. Mayo Smith, hired during the previous off-season, managed the Reds to a 35–45 start, seventh in the eight-team league. He was replaced during the first All-Star break by Fred Hutchinson, manager of their Triple-A Seattle Rainiers affiliate, on July 9. Hutchinson then led Cincinnati to a 39–35 record the rest of the way.

Season standings

Record vs. opponents

Notable transactions 
 May 1, 1959: Del Ennis was traded by the Reds to the Chicago White Sox for Lou Skizas and Don Rudolph.
 June 8, 1959: Hal Jeffcoat was traded by the Reds to the St. Louis Cardinals for Jim Brosnan.
 June 23, 1959: Walt Dropo was traded by the Reds to the Baltimore Orioles for Whitey Lockman.

Roster

Player stats

Batting

Starters by position 
Note: Pos = Position; G = Games played; AB = At bats; H = Hits; Avg. = Batting average; HR = Home runs; RBI = Runs batted in

Other batters 
Note: G = Games played; AB = At bats; H = Hits; Avg. = Batting average; HR = Home runs; RBI = Runs batted in

Pitching

Starting pitchers 
Note: G = Games pitched; IP = Innings pitched; W = Wins; L = Losses; ERA = Earned run average; SO = Strikeouts

Other pitchers 
Note: G = Games pitched; IP = Innings pitched; W = Wins; L = Losses; ERA = Earned run average; SO = Strikeouts

Relief pitchers 
Note: G = Games pitched; W = Wins; L = Losses; SV = Saves; ERA = Earned run average; SO = Strikeouts

Farm system 

LEAGUE CHAMPIONS: Havana

References

External links
1959 Cincinnati Redlegs season at Baseball Reference

Cincinnati Reds seasons
Cincinnati Reds season
Cincinnati Reds